Admira António is a Mozambican pilot, the first women to fly an airplane in Mozambique.

António started flying in 2011, learning at the Lanserie Flight Centre in South Africa. After training in France to pilot an Embraer-145, she joined LAM Mozambique Airlines in 2013. She qualified as commander in 2018.

References

Year of birth missing (living people)
Living people
Mozambican aviators
Commercial aviators
Women commercial aviators